HM Prison Aberdeen (formerly known as Craiginches) was a medium-security prison, located in the city of Aberdeen, Scotland. The prison was managed by the Scottish Prison Service. Known as one of the most overcrowded prisons in Scotland, it had a design capacity of 155 and was contracted to hold up to 230 prisoners. However, on the first day of an inspection in January 2009 it held 264 prisoners. In 2014, it was closed in favour of the new HMP Grampian.

In its latter years it saw an increase in inmates from outside the Grampian Sheriffdom, mainly from Wolverhampton and London. The diverse population led to many internal feuds and disputes. It ran exceptional drug rehabilitation programmes and was a pioneer for drug projects such as drug use kits etc. The management also wished to pilot a needle exchange programme. In August 2007 Aberdeen Prison was chosen to pilot a new initiative called the Substance Related Offending Behaviour Program (SROBP) piloted by Officers Graeme Robson and Allan Dewar which looked at prisoners finding the relationship between their substance use and their offending behaviour. This programme has been very successful in reducing rates of recidivism. Aberdeen Prison was also recognised for its investment in in-house Bereavement Counseling services facilitated by Graeme Robson and Wayne Lawson. On 4 June 2008, it was announced that HMP Aberdeen and HMP Peterhead would be merged into a "Super Prison" and a new state of the art prison built on the Peterhead site.

A new tranche of managers were recruited identifying key skills such as prisoner management, problem solving, project management and compliance. Initially identified was Graeme Robson who is now a Residential Compliance Manager. The "Super-Jail" can accommodate approx 500 prisoners and the new prison is known as HMP Grampian. Aberdeen Prison which served predominantly Aberdeen city and its environs has been closed and have been replaced by HMP & YOI Grampian, a prison located in Peterhead which has been described as a "community facing Prison". However 70% of Grampian's populace is from Aberdeen city.

Henry John Burnett, the last man to be executed in Scotland, was hanged inside the prison on 15 August 1963.

See also
List of prisons in the United Kingdom

References

External links
Scottish Prison Service, Aberdeen
2004 HM Inspectorate of Prisons Report
2009 HM Inspectorate of Prisons Report

1890 establishments in Scotland
Prisons in Scotland
Execution sites in Scotland
Buildings and structures in Aberdeen
2014 disestablishments in Scotland